Annulet may refer to:

 Annulet (heraldry), a mark in distinction
 Annulet (architecture), a fillet or ring encircling a column
 Annulet or Charissa obscurata, a species of moth in the family Geometridae

See also 
 Annulus (disambiguation)